Otto Hamacek (1 October 1896 – 26 March 1984) was an Austrian football player and coach.

As player he was a midfielder and played with SK Rapid Wien in the 1923–24 Austrian championship.  He played for the Vienna selection team in 1919 representing Rapid.

Later he became a coach and managed Swiss top-flight side FC Luzern between February and summer 1929 and Yugoslav side FK Vojvodina in the season 1931–32.

References

External sources
 
 Photo and profile at rapid.iam.at

1896 births
1984 deaths
Austrian footballers
Association football midfielders
SK Rapid Wien players
Austrian football managers
FC Luzern managers
Expatriate football managers in Switzerland
FK Vojvodina managers
Austrian expatriate sportspeople in Yugoslavia
Expatriate football managers in Yugoslavia